HMCS Oriole is the sail training vessel of the Royal Canadian Navy based at CFB Halifax in Halifax, Nova Scotia. She is a sailing ketch, currently the oldest commissioned vessel in the Royal Canadian Navy, and also the longest serving commissioned ship. Originally the  yacht Oriole IV, the vessel was acquired by the Royal Canadian Navy during the Second World War, then returned to private ownership at the end. Oriole IV was reacquired during the Cold War for use on the East Coast of Canada before switching to the West Coast of Canada in 1956. In 2018, the training vessel returned to the East Coast.

Description
Her sail plan includes flying sails set on her main and mizen . The vessel is equipped with an auxiliary Cummins diesel engine driving one shaft, creating . Oriole has a maximum speed of  while under power; she can exceed this speed under sail when conditions are right for her. The vessel has a complement of one officer and five ratings, with the capacity for 18 trainees.

History 

Oriole was originally laid down as the yacht Oriole IV by Dominion Shipbuilding in Toronto, Ontario, ordered by George H. Gooderham, the Commodore of the Royal Canadian Yacht Club of Toronto. Work was stopped on her construction due to a strike, but the vessel was taken to Neponset, Massachusetts, where she was completed. The ship was launched on 4 June 1921. The ketch served as the Royal Canadian Yacht Club's flagship from 1924 to 1928.

In 1941, Oriole IV was sold to the Navy League of Canada for use in training Sea Cadets. In 1943, during the Second World War, she was chartered by the Royal Canadian Navy as a training vessel. Following the war, the ship was returned to the Navy League, then she was again chartered by the Navy as a new recruit training vessel in 1950. Oriole IV subsequently moved to Halifax, Nova Scotia, in 1951. Her first year, the ketch was assigned to  before transferring to HMC Dockyard at Halifax for training cruises. She was officially commissioned as HMCS Oriole on 19 June 1952, and two years later, the navy moved her to CFB Esquimalt to become a training vessel attached to the Naval Officer Training Centre.

In 1984, Oriole returned to the East Coast of Canada, taking part in the 450th anniversary of Jacques Cartier's arrival in Quebec. The vessel participates in the annual Swiftsure Yacht Race on the West Coast of Canada. In March 2017, Oriole sailed for the East Coast of Canada to participate in the Tall Ships Regatta in Quebec and the Maritimes as part of Canada's 150th anniversary celebrations. Following the celebrations, Oriole underwent repairs at Lunenburg, Nova Scotia.

On 29 May 2018, Oriole officially changed homeports, returning to Halifax. From June through September 2018, Oriole deployed to the St. Lawrence River and Great Lakes on a training tour, visiting several Canadian ports. In 2019, the vessel returned to the Great Lakes for its annual three-month training deployment, visiting several ports.

Oriole celebrated her 100th anniversary in 2021 by making a series of port visits in Atlantic Canada.

See also
 List of Canadian Navy ships

References

Citations

Sources

External links

 
 HMCS Oriole – ReadyAyeReady.com

Fleet of the Royal Canadian Navy
1921 ships
Training ships of the Royal Canadian Navy
Auxiliary ships of the Royal Canadian Navy